François Déroche (born October 24, 1952) is an academic and specialist in Codicology and Palaeography. He is a professor at the Collège de France, where he is holding "History of the Quran Text and Transmission" Chair.

Biography 
Déroche was born on 24 October 1952 in Metz. After completing his Classe préparatoire at Lycée Henri-IV, he began his studies at the École Normale Supérieure in 1973. He got the Agrégation de Lettres classiques in 1976 and passed the Diplôme d'études approfondies in Egyptology in 1978. After a year of aggrégation internship, he was recruited in 1979 by the Bibliothèque nationale de France as a scientific resident, responsible for preparing the catalog of manuscripts of the Quran. In 1983 he was appointed a scientific resident at the French Institute of Anatolian Studies in Istanbul for a period of three years, he will remain in this city two additional years thanks to a grant from the Fondation Max van Berchem (Geneva). During his stay in Istanbul, he completed his doctoral thesis on the oasis of Dedan/al-'Ulâ that he defended in 1987. On his return to France in 1988, he was assigned to secondary education, first in the Paris region, then to Auneau and Châteauneuf-en-Thymerais. In 1990, he was elected director of studies at the Section of Historical and Philological Sciences at the École pratique des hautes études.

He was a vice-President, then a president of the Society for the Study of Prehistoric, Ancient and Medieval Maghreb, he directs the organization of study days in collaboration with the Académie des Inscriptions et Belles-Lettres, where he was elected as a correspondent on October 26, 2000 and a member on January 28, 2011; he is also involved in the preparation of the academic seminars of this society, in Tripoli (2005), Caen (2009) and Aix and Marseille (2014).

He is a member of many learned societies including the Société Asiatique, the Comité des travaux historiques et scientifiques, and the Board of Experts of the Al-Furqan Islamic Heritage Foundation in London. He is a member of the Board of Directors and Scientific Council of the École Pratique des Hautes Études.

Awards and honours 

 1988: CNRS Bronze Medal
 2008: Chevalier of the Legion of Honor
 2009: Commander of the Ordre des Palmes Académiques

Works 

 Catalogue des manuscrits arabes, fascicules 1 et 2, Bibliothèque nationale (France), département des manuscrits, Bibliothèque nationale.
 1989 - Manuscrits Moyen-Orient Essais de Codicologie et Paléographie, actes du colloque d’Istanbul, 26-29 mai 1986, Institut français d’études anatoliennes : Bibliothèque nationale.
 
 
 Scribes et manuscrits du Moyen-Orient, Bibliothèque nationale de France. 1997.

References 

1952 births
20th-century French historians
21st-century French historians
Chevaliers of the Légion d'honneur
Academic staff of the Collège de France
Commandeurs of the Ordre des Palmes Académiques
French Islamic studies scholars
French orientalists
Writers from Metz
Living people
Members of the Académie des Inscriptions et Belles-Lettres
École Normale Supérieure alumni
Codicologists